Big Miracle, originally Everybody Loves Whales, is a 2012 drama film directed by Ken Kwapis. It stars Drew Barrymore and John Krasinski. The film is based on Tom Rose's 1989 book Freeing the Whales, which covers Operation Breakthrough, the 1988 international effort to rescue gray whales trapped in ice near Point Barrow, Alaska.

Plot
In small town Alaska, Adam Carlson, a news reporter, recruits his ex-girlfriend Rachel – a Greenpeace volunteer – on a campaign to save a family of gray whales trapped by rapidly forming ice in the Arctic Circle. Adam names the adult whales Fred and Wilma, and the infant Bamm-Bamm.

Drawn into the collaborative rescue work are several normally hostile factions: Inupiat whale hunters, a Greenpeace environmental activist, an oil executive, ambitious news reporters, the National Guard, the American president and politicians on the state, national, and international levels. Also joining in the effort are two entrepreneurs from Minnesota, who provide de-icing machines to help keep the hole open.

Finally an enormous Soviet ice-breaker ship arrives to remove the last barrier before the whales die. The ship's first attempt leaves only a dent. The ice is finally broken and the adult whales escape the ice. The infant whale dies from injuries.

The epilogue, narrated by Nathan, reveals that McGraw used his new reputation to uphold a contract to clean up the Exxon Valdez oil spill, Karl and Dean's de-icers made them local celebrities, Scott and Kelly were married, Jill worked her way up to a national news network, Greenpeace membership became more prominent, Adam confesses his love for Rachel and she returns his affections and they share a kiss, Adam got to stay being a news anchor, and both Nathan and Malik became closer to one another, and Nathan recalls about the hole in which the whales were first found and quotes, "It kept getting bigger and bigger, until it let the whole world in."

Cast
 John Krasinski as Adam Carlson, based on Oran Caudle who was the Director of the North Slope Borough TV Studio
 Drew Barrymore as Rachel Kramer, based on Greenpeace activist Cindy Lowry
 Ahmaogak Sweeney as Inupiat grandson Nathan to Malik
 Sweeney also narrated the film.
 John Pingayak as Inupiat whaler Malik
 Kristen Bell as Jill Gerard, a news reporter
 Vinessa Shaw as Kelly Meyers, based on Bonnie Carroll
 Stephen Root as Gov. Haskell
 Ted Danson as J.W. McGraw
 Kathy Baker as Ruth McGraw
 Dermot Mulroney as Colonel Scott Boyer, based on General Tom Carroll
 Rob Riggle as Dean Glowacki
 Michael Gaston as Porter Beckford
 Ken Smith as Stu
 Megan Angela Smith as Sheena
 Tim Blake Nelson as Pat Lafayette
 James LeGros as Karl Hootkin
 Mark Ivanir as Dimitri
 Stefan Kapicic as Yuri
 Andrew Daly as Don Davis
 Jonathan Slavin as Roger Notch
 Gregory Jbara as General Stanton
 John Michael Higgins as Wes Handrick
 Sarah Palin as herself (archive footage, as Sarah Heath, in her brief sportscasting career)

Production
Warner Bros. bought the screenplay by Jack Amiel and Michael Begler in April 2009, and in the following June, Kwapis was attached to direct. In September 2010, with Drew Barrymore and John Krasinski cast in the starring roles, filming began in Seward. It had a production budget of $30 or 40 million. The crew constructed sets in Anchorage to resemble places in Utqiagvik during the whale rescue. The film's working title was Everybody Loves Whales, which is a line still heard in the film. Visual effects on Big Miracle were created by Rhythm and Hues Studios and Modus FX. Burger King promoted the movie with toys. The MPAA has rated this film PG for language.

The red-and-black Soviet icebreaker in the movie is modeled after real world Arktika-class nuclear-powered icebreaker which is considerably larger than the diesel-electric icebreaker used in the actual rescue effort, the 1975-built Admiral Makarov. In shots which include live footage of the 2007-built 50 Let Pobedy, the blue-and-white polar bear logo of the former operator of the Russian nuclear icebreaker fleet, Murmansk Shipping Company, is clearly visible but the atom symbol on the hull as well as the name of the vessel has been airbrushed out.

Reception
On the review aggregator Rotten Tomatoes, the film holds a "Certified Fresh" rating of 75% based on reviews from 104 critics. The site's consensus was: "Big Miracle uses real-life events as the basis for a surprisingly satisfying family drama." On Metacritic the film holds a score of 61 out of 100 based on 28 reviews.

The film grossed $2,267,385 on its opening day, ranking at No. 4 behind Chronicle, The Woman in Black, and The Grey at the box office. The film grossed $7,760,205 on its opening weekend and remained at the same spot. On its second weekend the film dropped to #8, with $3,946,050. The film closed its run on April 5, 2012, with $24,719,215 worldwide.

References

Further reading

External links
 
 

2012 films
2012 drama films
American drama films
British drama films
Films about animal rights
Films about whales
Films based on non-fiction books
Films set in 1988
Films set in Alaska
Films set in the Arctic
Films shot in Alaska
Universal Pictures films
Working Title Films films
Films scored by Cliff Eidelman
Films directed by Ken Kwapis
Films produced by Eric Fellner
Films produced by Steve Golin
Films produced by Tim Bevan
2010s English-language films
2010s American films
2010s British films